Monkton railway station was a railway station on the Glasgow to Ayr main line serving the village of Monkton, South Ayrshire, Scotland. It opened in 1839. Monkton did not develop and the station was closed in 1940. The location may be identified by the overbridge that leads to Monkton House.

The site of the former station is occupied by fuel sidings used by Prestwick Airport.

History 
The Glasgow, Paisley, Kilmarnock and Ayr Railway opened its main line in stages. That between Irvine and an "Ayr" station (at the site of the present-day Newton-on-Ayr) was opened on 5 August 1839. Monkton station was opened on the line from the outset, although probably spelt Monckton initially. It was located about a mile north of the present-day Prestwick International station, at the place where an overbridge carries a road to Monkton House. The station served the house, and the village of Monkton, located about a mile to the east.

The station is listed in Bradshaw in the 1840s, for example in 1843, The Glasgow, Paisley, Kilmarnock and Ayr Railway combined with other companies to form the Glasgow and South Western Railway. The station was closed on 28 October 1940 by the London, Midland and Scottish Railway.

Reference to satellite images shows aviation fuel tank wagons in a siding at the former station, serving Prestwick airport.

References 

Disused railway stations in South Ayrshire
Railway stations in Great Britain closed in 1940
Former Glasgow and South Western Railway stations